Jinnah is a 1998 PakistaniBritish epic biographical film which follows the life of the founder of Pakistan, Muhammad Ali Jinnah. It was directed by Jamil Dehlavi, and written by Akbar S. Ahmed and Jamil Dehlavi. It stars Christopher Lee in the lead role as Jinnah.

To make this film, Shashi Kapoor wanted to invest $1 million. Shashi Kapoor was the victim of controversy from India and Pakistan for acting in the film. It was shown in Mill Valley Film Festival on 15 October 1999. The director of the film accused Akbar Ahmed of embezzling money from the film. Former Channel 4 executive Farrukh Dhondy also helped write the screenplay for the film for £12,000.

Plot
The film opens with the words of Professor Stanley Wolpert:

The guide takes Jinnah to 1947 where, at the Cromwell Conference with Lord Mountbatten, Jinnah demanded a homeland for Indian Muslims. After World War II, the British Imperial Government intends to withdraw and grant independence to the subcontinent. This would mean a Hindu-dominated state. Religious tensions between Hindus and Muslims were increasing after the Second World War. 
Flashbacks resume when the Guide recounts the marital life of Jinnah, when he fell in love and married a Parsi named Rattanbai Petit, later known  against the will of her parents, mainly on grounds of religion and the difference in their ages. In 1922, Jinnah faces political isolation as he devoted every spare moment to be the voice of moderation in a nation torn by Hindu-Muslim antipathy. That created tension between Rattanbai and Jinnah. She finally leaves him with their daughter in September 1922, and they eventually separate in 1927. Rattanbai died of cancer on 18 February 1929. The death of Rattanbai had a huge impact on Jinnah's life and his fight for Pakistan. He went back to British India in order to start a political journey of the two-nation theory. In 1940, the Muslim League annual conference is held from 22 to 24 March. Jinnah addresses thousands of Muslims and gives them the assurance of the birth of Pakistan.

The Guide questions Jinnah as to who he loves the most apart from Ruttie and Fatima. He then mentioned his daughter, who married a Parsi boy without his permission.

While he was addressing a Muslim League conference in 1947, Muslims fanatics attacked the conference and argued that if Pakistan is to be a Muslim state, it cannot give equal rights to women and non-Muslims. Jinnah replies that Islam doesn't need fanatics but people with vision who can build the country. However, the partition of India was carried out, and the Guide and Jinnah saw the massacre of Muslims in migration done by Hindus and Sikhs. Jinnah is sworn in as the first Governor-General of Pakistan and announces Liaquat Ali Khan as the first Prime Minister of Pakistan. Jinnah then says goodbye to his daughter. Dina promises that she will visit him but she tell that her home is now in Bombay with her husband and child.

After independence and the end of British rule, Pakistan stands as a new nation and sanctuary for the Muslims of the subcontinent. Jinnah is given the title of Quaid-e-Azam of Pakistan. Jinnah waits for the first train carrying Muslims who left India for Pakistan, but when the train arrives, they are all found dead save for one infant child. Fatimah and Lady Edwina Mountbatten visit refugees and Lady Mountbatten learns the importance of independence. Mountbatten betrays Jinnah as the Hindu Maharaja of Kashmir, Sir Hari Singh, stalls his decision on which nation to join. With the population in revolt in October 1947, aided by Pakistani irregulars, the Maharaja accedes to India; Indian troops are airlifted in. Jinnah objects to that and orders that Pakistani troops move into Kashmir, which leads to a war between India and Pakistan then and afterward from time to time in the Kashmir conflict.

The film jumps into a final fictional scene of Lord Louis Mountbatten, 1st Earl Mountbatten of Burma (last Viceroy of India) in a Heavenly Court. Jinnah is fighting a case against him over his betrayal. The film ends with Jinnah and his angel judge traveling back in time to the scene of Muslim refugees. Jinnah expresses his sorrow over the plight of the refugees during the division of Punjab. They chant "Pakistan Zindabad" in response, which ends the film.

Cast

Soundtrack

Critical reception
It received an overwhelmingly positive response in Pakistan. Christopher Lee spoke highly of the film, calling his performance in it the best of his career as well as stressing the importance of the film.

However, the casting of Christopher Lee in lead role led to a large amount of media controversy in Pakistan because of his previous roles in horror films and vampire films as Count Dracula, with Lee having received death threats which required personal bodyguards during filming. BBC News reported that the threats were due to his previous film roles and not that he was a European playing an Asian. Some critics even demanded a ban on the film.

International awards
 Grand Prize - Zanzibar International Film Festival
 Best International Film - World Film Awards, Indonesia
 Gold Award Best Foreign Film - Worldfest Flagstaff 
 Silver Award, 1999 - WorldFest-Houston International Film Festival
 Golden Pyramid Award Nomination - Cairo International Film Festival

See also
 List of Islamic films
 Cinema in Pakistan
 List of Asian historical drama films
 List of artistic depictions of Mahatma Gandhi

References

External links 
 
 
 Christopher Lee on the making of legends and Jinnah
 Christopher Lee launches film about Jinnah in London (Asians in Media Magazine)

Film reviews 
 Troubled Jinnah movie opens (BBC News, September, 1998)
 IO Film Reviews
 Close-up Film Review: Jinnah
 "Jinnah the Movie" reviews by Rizwan

1998 films
1990s biographical films
1990s historical films
1990s English-language films
1998 multilingual films
Pakistani biographical films
Pakistani multilingual films
British multilingual films
Pakistani epic films
Films set in 1947
British Pakistani films
British biographical films
British epic films
1990s Urdu-language films
English-language Pakistani films
History of Pakistan on film
Epic films based on actual events
Films set in Pakistan
Films set in India
Films set in the British Raj
Films set in the Indian independence movement
Films set in the partition of India
History of India on film
Films shot in Karachi
Historical epic films
Media related to Muhammad Ali Jinnah
Cultural depictions of Muhammad Ali Jinnah
Cultural depictions of Jawaharlal Nehru
Cultural depictions of Mahatma Gandhi
Cultural depictions of Louis Mountbatten, 1st Earl Mountbatten of Burma
Heaven in popular culture
Films about Islam
Film controversies in Pakistan
1990s British films
Urdu-language Pakistani films